Tomislav Mazalović (born 10 June 1990) is a Croatian footballer who plays for Croatian club Gaj Mače as a midfielder.

Career

Cibalia/Inter Zaprešić
Born in Vinkovci, Mazalović made his professional debut with Cibalia in 2008 and in the course of six years which he spent in the club, he made 143 league appearances. He scored his first goal for the club in November 2008, in a 3–1 victory over Sesvete. In 2010, he featured in an UEFA Europa League match against Cliftonville where he unsuccessfully shot at the goal a number of times. In July 2013, it was announced that his contract would not be renewed and would be released at the end of the season.

Mazalović moved to Inter Zaprešić in 2014. In October 2015, he scored his first goal in the Croatian First Football League in a 3–0 victory against Istra 1961. He received a red card in the 67th minute of a match against Hajduk Split in March 2017. In July 2016, he wore the captain's armband for the first time in a match due to the absence of Ivan Čović and Ivan Čeliković. He was injured in the month of May during a match against Cibalia.

Diósgyőri VTK
After having amassed 201 caps in the Croatian first tier, Mazalovic moved abroad and joined Hungarian club Diósgyőri VTK on 18 June 2018.

Career statistics

Club

References

External links 

1990 births
Living people
Sportspeople from Vinkovci
Association football midfielders
Croatian footballers
Croatia youth international footballers
HNK Cibalia players
NK Inter Zaprešić players
Diósgyőri VTK players
Croatian Football League players
First Football League (Croatia) players
Nemzeti Bajnokság I players
Croatian expatriate footballers
Expatriate footballers in Hungary
Croatian expatriate sportspeople in Hungary